Jared Quay Campbell (born August 30, 1989) is an American stand-up comedian, host, actor, and former football safety. He was born in Denver, Colorado. He played college football at the University of Miami and was a member of the Arizona Cardinals.

Early life
Campbell was born in Denver, Colorado to an African-American father and mother, Campbell played his high school football at Overland High School in Aurora, Colorado. Widely regarded as one of the nation's top defensive back prospects, Campbell chose Miami over Colorado, Washington, and Nebraska. While at the University of Miami, Campbell started doing stand-up comedy, but quit after just three months due to how late night comedy shows didn’t match well with the early morning football practices.

Campbell holds degrees in communication studies and geography from University of Miami.

Career
After retiring from the NFL, Campbell moved to Los Angeles and returned to the comedy stage in 2013. He regularly performs at major comedy clubs around Los Angeles.

Campbell started his own production company along with his older brother Baltimore Ravens defensive end Calais Campbell in 2017 and produced an episode of "The Process" for LeBron James Uninterrupted company. He then went on to produce segments for the TV show, That Other Pregame Show on CBS Sports. In 2018, Yahoo Sports hired him to host The Rush with Jared Quay.  He also developed, produced, and hosted the show "Family Huddle" alongside his brother Calais, at Yahoo Sports.

References

External links
 
College stats

1989 births
Living people
21st-century American comedians
21st-century American male actors
African-American media personalities
African-American male actors
African-American male comedians
American male comedians
African-American screenwriters
African-American stand-up comedians
American stand-up comedians
Arizona Cardinals players
Miami Hurricanes football players
American football safeties
Players of American football from Denver
21st-century American screenwriters
21st-century African-American writers
20th-century African-American people